Gisela C. Lebzelter is an author, historian, and scholar, and an expert on British fascism and antisemitism. Scholars who study British fascism and antisemitism frequently cite her 1978 book Political Anti-Semitism in England 1918-1939—a revision of her thesis submitted to St Antony's College, Oxford.

Lebzelter has done much research on The Britons (responsible for repeatedly publishing The Protocols of the Elders of Zion in the UK), including its founding President, Henry Hamilton Beamish, and his successor, John Henry Clarke.

Dr. Lebzelter has a non-Jewish background. She was a student at the Free University of Berlin and University College London.

Works 
 Political Anti-Semitism in England, 1918-1939
(Thesis [D.Phil.]--University of Oxford, 1977)
Description: 5, ii, 349 leaves: ill.; 30 cm.
BLDSC reference no.: D37413/87.

 Ibid.
(New York: Holmes & Meier Publishers, Inc., 1978)

 Ibid.
(London: Macmillan, in association with St Antony’s College, Oxford, 1978) :

Notes

References 
 Davies, Alan T. and Marilyn F. Nefsky, How Silent Were the Churches?: Canadian Protestantism and the Jewish Plight During the Nazi Era, (Waterloo, Ont.: Wilfrid Laurier University Press, 1997),  (pbk.)
 Ceplair, Larry S., Under the Shadow of War: Fascism, Anti-Fascism, and Marxists, 1918-1939, (New York: Columbia University Press, 1987), 
 Spurr, Michael A., "'Playing for Fascism': Sportsmanship, Antisemitism and the British Union of Fascists", Patterns of Prejudice, Volume 37, Issue 4, December 2003, pp. 359–376

External links 
 Review at JSTOR

Living people
Scholars of antisemitism
British writers
English historians
Year of birth missing (living people)